The 1949–50 NBA season was the second season for the Fort Wayne Pistons in the National Basketball Association (NBA), and ninth overall as a franchise. 

After missing the playoffs for the first time in 1949 the franchise made their first NBA playoff berth, starting a streak of 14 straight post-season berths.  After beating the Chicago Stags 86-69 in a tiebreaker game,  the Pistons entered the playoffs as the three seed in the east and defeated their old rivals, the Rochester Royals, in a first round sweep, before the Pistons got swept by the eventual champion Minneapolis Lakers.  Fort Wayne was led by Indiana basketball legend point guard Curly Armstrong (7.3 ppg, 2.8 apg) and rookie forward Fred Schaus (14.3 ppg).

Draft picks

Roster

|-
! colspan="2" style="background-color: #00519a;  color: #FFFFFF; text-align: center;" | Fort Wayne Pistons 1949–50 roster
|- style="background-color: #eb003c; color: #FFFFFF;   text-align: center;"
! Players !! Coaches
|- 
| valign="top" |

! Pos. !! # !! Nat. !! Name !! Ht. !! Wt. !! From
|-

Regular season

Season standings

Record vs. opponents

Game log

Playoffs

|- align="center" bgcolor="#ccffcc"
| 1
| March 20
| Chicago
| W 86–69
| Fred Schaus (18)
| Fred Schaus (6)
| North Side High School Gym
| 1–0
|-

|- align="center" bgcolor="#ccffcc"
| 1
| March 23
| @ Rochester
| W 90–84
| Wager, Schaefer (18)
| Edgerton Park Arena
| 1–0
|- align="center" bgcolor="#ccffcc"
| 2
| March 24
| Rochester
| W 79–78 (OT)
| Bob Carpenter (27)
| North Side High School Gym
| 2–0
|-

|- align="center" bgcolor="#ffcccc"
| 1
| March 27
| @ Minneapolis
| L 79–93
| Fred Schaus (20)
| Fred Schaus (4)
| Minneapolis Auditorium
| 0–1
|- align="center" bgcolor="#ffcccc"
| 2
| March 28
| Minneapolis
| L 82–89
| Fred Schaus (33)
| —
| North Side High School Gym
| 0–2
|-

Awards and records
Fred Schaus, All-NBA Second Team

References

Detroit Pistons seasons
Fort Wayne